Jack Crawford defeated Harry Hopman 6–4, 6–2, 2–6, 6–1 in the final to win the men's singles tennis title at the 1931 Australian Championships.

Seeds
The seeded players are listed below. Jack Crawford is the champion; others show the round in which they were eliminated.

 Jack Crawford (champion)
 Harry Hopman (finalist)
 Gar Moon (quarterfinals)
 Jack Cummings (semifinals)
 Clifford Sproule (quarterfinals)
 Ray Dunlop (first round)
 Harry Hassett (quarterfinals)
 Don Turnbull (semifinals)

Draw

Key
 Q = Qualifier
 WC = Wild card
 LL = Lucky loser
 r = Retired

Earlier rounds

Section 1

Section 2

Notes

References

External links
 

1931
1931 in Australian tennis
Men's Singles